The 1877 City of Auckland West by-election was a by-election held  on 2 May 1877 in the  electorate during the 6th New Zealand Parliament. It was then a two-member electorate.

The by-election was caused by the resignation of the incumbent, Benjamin Tonks.

James Wallis a clergyman was elected.

His opponent Robert Graham was a former Superintendent of Auckland Province, and there was some surprise at his defeat.

Result
The following table gives the election result:

References 

Auckland West 1877
1877 elections in New Zealand
May 1877 events
Politics of the Auckland Region
1870s in Auckland